Hylton Dayes is the head men's soccer coach at the University of Cincinnati. He has coached the Bearcats since 2001, and has compiled an 80–73–21 mark there.

Career
He played his college soccer at Wright State University, where he was a four-year starter. From 1986 to 1993, he was the head women's soccer coach at Wright State. From 1994 to 1996, he served as an assistant coach at James Madison University. From 1997 to 2000, he was the head men's soccer coach at Wright State University, where he went 32–37–8. 

At Cincinnati, he led the Bearcats to their third ever NCAA tournament appearance in 2006, and is the winningest soccer coach in school history. His 2006 team won the Big East red division title, and was ranked as high as 14th in the nation at one point. After 28 seasons his overall career record as a head coach stood at 232–244–63. He retired from Cincinnati in 2020.

He played professional soccer for the Dayton Dynamo and the Orlando Lions.

Personal life
Dayes was married to Karen Ferguson-Dayes in 2008, and has a son, Brandon.

References

Cincinnati Bearcats men's soccer coaches
James Madison Dukes men's soccer coaches
Wright State Raiders men's soccer coaches
Living people
Dayton Dynamo players
Orlando Lions players
Wright State Raiders men's soccer players
Association football defenders
Jamaican footballers
1964 births
Jamaican football managers